Việt Yên is a rural district of Bắc Giang province in the Northeast region of Vietnam. Việt Yên borders on the south with Bắc Ninh province; on the west with Hiệp Hòa district; on the east with Yên Dũng district; and on the north with Tân Yên district and Bắc Giang City.

Administrative divisions

The district is divided into two townships: Bích Động (capital) and Nếnh, and communes: Quang Châu, Ninh Sơn, Tiên Sơn, Trung Hà, Bích Sơn, Nghĩa Trung, Hồng Thái, Tăng Tiến, Quảng Minh, Vân Hà, Vân Trung, Việt Tiến, Thượng Lan, Minh Đức, Tự Lạn, Hương Mai, Hoàng Ninh.

References

Districts of Bắc Giang province